Andreas Renz (born 12 June 1977) is a German ice hockey player. He competed in the men's tournaments at the 2002 Winter Olympics and the 2006 Winter Olympics.

Career statistics

Regular season and playoffs

International

References

External links
 

1977 births
Living people
Olympic ice hockey players of Germany
Ice hockey players at the 2002 Winter Olympics
Ice hockey players at the 2006 Winter Olympics
People from Villingen-Schwenningen
Sportspeople from Freiburg (region)